Sikorsky Credit Union is a state-chartered credit union headquartered in Stratford, Connecticut, that was founded in 1948. It was started to serve the employees of Sikorsky Aircraft, as well as their immediate family. Membership was expanded to cover all residents of Fairfield County, Hartford County and New Haven County in Connecticut.

Sikorsky Credit Union is a member of the National Credit Union Administration (NCUA) and the SUM ATM network.

References

External links
 Official website

Credit unions based in Connecticut
1948 establishments in Connecticut
Companies based in Stratford, Connecticut
Lockheed Martin
Banks established in 1948